Colin James Kilrain (born 1958) is a retired United States Navy vice admiral who last served as the assistant to the chairman of the Joint Chiefs of Staff from October 20, 2021 to February 2023. He previously served as the associate director for military affairs (ADMA) for the Central Intelligence Agency from 2019 to 2021. He is the former commander of Special Operations Command Pacific and Naval Special Warfare Group Two.

Early life and education
Raised in Quincy, Massachusetts, Kilrain graduated from Lehigh University.

Naval career
Kilrain entered active duty with the United States Navy after completing Officer Candidate School in Newport, Rhode Island, in 1985. After his commission as an ensign, he received orders to Basic Underwater Demolition/SEAL training (BUD/S) at Naval Amphibious Base Coronado. After six months of training, Kilrain graduated BUD/S in 1986. Following SEAL Tactical Training (STT) and completion of a six-month probationary period, he received the 1130 designator as a Naval Special Warfare Officer, entitled to wear the Special Warfare insignia, also known as the "SEAL Trident". 
As a Navy SEAL officer, Kilrain received his first assignment to SEAL TEAM TWO, where he served as assistant platoon commander and platoon commander until 1990. Kilrain studied German at the Defense Language Institute and was selected for an exchange program with the German Navy Kampfschwimmer in Eckenförde, Germany. In 1993, Kilrain volunteered for assignment to the Naval Special Warfare Development Group (NSWDG) at Dam Neck, Virginia and completed a specialized selection and training course. Kilrain served at NSWDG until 1996, planning, rehearsing and directing classified operations. Kilrain earned a Master of Science degree in national resources strategy and management from the Industrial College of the Armed Forces (ICAF).

Kilrain served numerous staff and command assignments, including as maritime operations officer, Special Operations Command South, Panama; executive officer, Naval Special Warfare Unit TWO, Germany; special operations adviser,  (CVN-69); operations officer for the State Department's Office of Counterterrorism; commanding officer, Naval Special Warfare Unit FOUR, Puerto Rico from 2001 to 2003 and commanding officer, SEAL TEAM FOUR. Kilrain was promoted to the rank of captain in December 2006. He assumed command of Naval Special Warfare Group TWO (NSWG2) from 2009 to 2011, which was responsible for preparing East Coast based SEAL TEAMS for their operational deployments overseas. 

He later served a staff tour as the director of Strategy and Policy for the Office of Combating Terrorism, National Security Council, Executive Office of the President at the White House during the Obama Administration. Kilrain later served as Senior Defense Officer at the U.S. Embassy in Mexico City. As a rear admiral, he served as assistant commander of Joint Special Operations Command in 2013 followed by assignment to Camp H. M. Smith, Hawaii as commander, Special Operations Command Pacific from 2014 to 2016.  As a vice admiral, he served as commander, NATO Special Operations Headquarters, Supreme Headquarters Allied Powers Europe (SHAPE) from July 2016 to November 2019.

Awards and decorations

References

1958 births
Living people
Place of birth missing (living people)
People from Quincy, Massachusetts
Lehigh University alumni
SEAL Team Six personnel
Dwight D. Eisenhower School for National Security and Resource Strategy alumni
Recipients of the Legion of Merit
United States Navy vice admirals
Recipients of the Defense Superior Service Medal
Military personnel from Massachusetts